Ruhner Berge is a municipality in the Ludwigslust-Parchim district, in Mecklenburg-Vorpommern, Germany. It was created with effect from 1 January 2019 by the merger of the former municipalities of Marnitz, Suckow and Tessenow. Its name derives from the Ruhner Berge, a chain of hills.

References

Ludwigslust-Parchim